The 2007–08 Washington Huskies men's basketball team represented the University of Washington in the 2007–08 college basketball season.  This marked the head coach Lorenzo Romar's 6th season at Washington. The Huskies played their home games at Bank of America Arena and are members of the Pacific-10 Conference. They finished the season 16–17, 7–11 in Pac-10 play. They lost in the first round of the 2008 Pacific-10 Conference men's basketball tournament by California. They were invited to the 2008 College Basketball Invitational which they lost to Valparaiso in the first round.

2007–08 Team

Roster
Source

Coaching staff

2007–08 Schedule and results

|-
!colspan=9| Exhibition

|-
!colspan=9| Regular Season

|-
!colspan=9| 2008 Pacific-10 Conference men's basketball tournament

|-
!colspan=9| 2008 College Basketball Invitational

References

Washington
Washington Huskies men's basketball seasons
Washington
Washington
Washington